Gandang Gabi, Vice! is a Philippine late-night comedy talk show broadcast by ABS-CBN, hosted by Vice Ganda. The program premiered from May 22, 2011, and aired every Sunday from 9:30 PM to 10:30 PM, on the network's Yes Weekend! block. The talk show focuses on comedic interviews and interactive segments with celebrity guests, and from time to time, also features live acts from various performers.

The program was originally intended for only one season consisting of thirteen episodes, but after the announcement of the show's planned ending on February 19, 2012, due to the enormous feedback requesting the show's renewal, it was announced that the show's supposed end was only to be the finale of the first season, and that the show will continue with a second season the following week. During early incarnations, Gandang Gabi, Vice! initially tagged as "the Trending Capital of the Philippines" due to its consistent trending on micro-social networking site Twitter.

Due to the lockdown caused by the COVID-19 pandemic in the Philippines, replays of previous episodes of the show were aired from March 15, 2020 until the temporary shutdown of ABS-CBN. This is because of the suspension of airing live entertainment shows and taping by the network, which resulted in the postponement of the airing of the replacement show Everybody, Sing!.

History
The show frequently opens with an opening act composing of a song either performed by Vice Ganda or another featured musician, and a dance performance onstage (commonly dancers and finalists from Vice Ganda's program It's Showtime.) Afterwards, the host introduces the show and the featured guests in the episode, including an unidentified guest who will star on the show later. After a commercial, guests are introduced during each of the show's segments. One segment, titled Vice Advice, features Vice and his guest/s giving advice to citizens onstage or from the show's official site in the social networking sites Facebook and Twitter. The segment ends with a composed song likewise giving a message to the latter. This segment changed its format on the show's fifth episode. In the new format, Vice will draw questions in a crystal ball containing questions that were posted by the followers on the show's Twitter and he will try to answer hilariously as many questions as he can for one minute. After that, he will present a certain issue and will ask an audience his/her opinion regarding the issue. The segment still ends with a composed song pertaining to the issue tackled.

After all guests have been interviewed, Vice closes the show with a challenge, wherein audience members participate in a game or prank to win various prizes. All segments are serenaded by a band led by musical director Marvin Querido.

Gandang Gabi, Vice! premiered its pilot episode on May 22, 2011, and has since aired every Sunday nights at 10:30PM (PST) on ABS-CBN. The first season was originally set for thirteen episodes only, but was extended due to positive reviews from the audience. Due to another Sunday program Sarah G. Live, the second season's first episode was moved to 10:15PM (PST). On October 27, 2012, the show temporarily moved to an earlier timeslot at 9:30PM (PST) to fill the vacant of a weekend reality show. It was later moved to 9:15PM (PST) in 2013.

In its later years, the show's starting airtime was at 10:30PM (PST)-10:45PM (PST). However, in early 2020, the show returned to its 9:30PM (PST) timeslot.

The show aired its final episode on March 8, 2020 with Raffy Tulfo as its last guest after almost 9 years. Replays of the show were aired from March 15, 2020 until the ABS-CBN shutdown due to the suspension of airing live entertainment shows and taping by the network due to the COVID-19 pandemic. The show was originally set to be replaced by Everybody, Sing!, a musical comedy game show which will also be hosted by Vice Ganda. Originally set to premiere on March 15, 2020, the airing of its pilot episode has been postponed to June 5, 2021, still due to the aforementioned decision that was done by the network.

Due to popular demand, re-runs of GGV exclusively streams on Kapamilya Online Live Global every Sunday & Monday at 4:00 am (PST).

Final hosts
Main host
 Vice Ganda (2011–2020)

Featuring
 Negi (2011–2020)
 Wacky Kiray (2016–2020)
 Brenda Mage (2019–2020)
 Carlo Mendoza (2017)
 Petite (2020)

Guest Hosts / Co-Hosts
 Toni Gonzaga (2019)
 Alex Gonzaga (2019)
 Ryan Bang (2020)

Reception
The pilot episode debuted with a 21.9% rating of television viewers across the Philippines despite its late-primetime schedule, ranking third behind the talent show Pilipinas Got Talent and the news magazine program Rated K for the highest rating of TV viewers for a Sunday daytime and primetime television program. As of its sixth episode, the show had an average of 20.9% of viewers per episode across the country despite its late night airing.

Accolades
 2012 – 26th PMPC Star Awards for Television's "Best Celebrity & Showbiz-Oriented Talk Show" – Gandang Gabi, Vice! (Nominated)
 2012 – 26th PMPC Star Awards for Television's "Best Male Celebrity & Showbiz-Oriented Talk Show Host" – Vice Ganda (Won)
 2013 – 27th PMPC Star Awards for Television's "Best Celebrity Talk Show Host" – Vice Ganda (Won)
 2014 – 28th PMPC Star Awards for Television's "Best Celebrity Talk Show" – Gandang Gabi, Vice! (Won)
 2014 – 28th Star Awards for Television's "Best Celebrity Talk Show Host" – Vice Ganda (Won)
 2017 – 31st PMPC Star Awards for Television's "Best Celebrity Talk Show" – Gandang Gabi, Vice! (Won)

References

External links

Gandang Gabi, Vice! on Facebook
Gandang Gabi, Vice! on Twitter
Gandang Gabi, Vice! on Instagram

ABS-CBN original programming
Philippine comedy television series
Philippine television talk shows
2011 Philippine television series debuts
2020 Philippine television series endings
Late night television programming
Filipino-language television shows